In mathematics, the Siegel–Weil formula, introduced by  as an extension of the results of ,  expresses an Eisenstein series as a weighted average of theta series of lattices in a genus, where the weights are proportional to the inverse of the order of the automorphism group of the lattice.
For the constant terms this is essentially the Smith–Minkowski–Siegel mass formula.

References

Theorems in number theory